The Blue Ribbon Award for Best Supporting Actress is a prize recognizing an outstanding performance by a female supporting actress in a Japanese film. It is awarded annually by the Association of Tokyo Film Journalists as one of the Blue Ribbon Awards.

List of winners

References

External links
Blue Ribbon Awards on IMDb

Awards established in 1951
1951 establishments in Japan
Supporting actress
Film awards for supporting actress